Parliamentary elections were held in Kingdom of Dalmatia for the newly formed Dalmatian parliament in 1861.

Results

Elected representatives

Autonomist Party
From Zadar
 Vittorio Bioni
 Cosimo de Begna Possedaria
 Vincenzo Duplancich
 Antonio Smirich (from 1863: Giovanni Salghetti-Drioli)
 Antonio Bajamonti
 Spiro Petrović 
 Natale Filippi
 Giacomo Ghiglianovich
 Francesco Borreli
From Split
 Leonardo Dudan
 Giorgio Giovannizio
 Luigi Lapenna
 Vincenzo degli Alberti
From Šibenik
 Antonio Galvani
From Makarska
 Giacomo Vucovich 
From Dubrovnik
 Giovanni Radmilli
 Luigi Serragli
From Korčula
 Giovanni Smerchinich
From Hvar
 Girolamo Macchiedo
 Giovanni Macchiedo
 Girolamo Vusio
From Skradin
 Simeone Bujas
 Giovanni Marasović
From Drniš
 Melchiorre Difnico
From Trogir
 Antonio Radman
 Antonio Fanfogna
From Sinj
 Josip Dešković
 Anton Buljan 
From Imotski
 Niccolò Mirossevich

People's Party

From Dubrovnik
 Miho Klaić
 Marino Giorni
From Kotor
 Josip Gjurović (from 1863 Kosta Vojnović)
 Bernardo Verona (from 1863 Josip Banović-Damianović)
From Benkovac
 Petar Radulović
From Drniš
 Pane Sablić
 Kristo Kulišić
From Vrgorac
 Miho Pavlinović
From Cavtat
 Djure Pulić
From Ston
 Krsto Jerković
From Budva
 Luka Tripcović
 Stjepan Mitrov Ljubiša

References

Elections in Croatia
Dalmatia
1861 in Croatia
Elections in Austria-Hungary
History of Dalmatia
Election and referendum articles with incomplete results